HMS Brazen was a 28-gun Royal Navy Bittern-class ship sloop, launched in 1808.

Though she served during the Napoleonic Wars, she appears to have missed any combat whatsoever and to have taken few prizes in that conflict. However, in the War of 1812 between the United States and the United Kingdom she captured Beaver and Warren in the Gulf of Mexico, but Warren was wrecked on Grand Gosier Island, near New Orleans, in a hurricane. Brazen suffered severe damage in the hurricane and, after local repair, was recalled to England for a survey.

After the survey she escorted convoys to Canada and back and recaptured Daphne. She then carried the Duke of Brunswick to Holland and patrolled the Irish Sea until her return to the West Indies Station. In 1815, she carried the news of the Treaty of Ghent, ending the War of 1812, to British troops that had captured Fort Bowyer and assisted in carrying them to England. After the war she took part in surveys of the Venezuelan coast and patrolled the Gulf of Mexico, capturing several prizes.

In the 1820s she served with the West Africa Squadron working to suppress the slave trade. In this service she captured numerous slavers and liberated over 2,000 slaves. Brazen ended her career as a floating chapel and was broken up in 1848.

The War of 1812
She was commissioned by Commander Lewis Shepard in July 1808 for the Jamaica station.  She was built in Portsmouth Dockyard by Nicholas Diddams.
Shepard was promoted to post-captain on 21 October 1810. From October 1810 she was under the command of Richard Plummer Davies, still on the Jamaica station.

Between June 1812 and August 1818 she was under the command of Commander James Stirling and for most of that time served in the West Indies. Stirling joined the ship in Port Royal Harbour, Jamaica, on 29 June 1812 and on 11 July Brazen  left on her first mission in the War of 1812, to harass American ports and shipping in the Gulf of Mexico.

On 6 August 1812, near the Balize entrance to the Mississippi, she captured the US brig Beaver, which was sailing to Havana with a cargo of sugar and coffee. She put the crew and two river pilots ashore and then a prize crew of a lieutenant and five seamen sailed Beaver to Jamaica.

On 18 August 1812 Brazen captured Warren near Horn Island, off the coast of Mississippi. However, the next day she was cast on shore and wrecked in the hurricane of 19/20 August 1812.  Brazen also suffered severely. Lloyd's List reported that she and the frigate  had run aground and lost their masts on the coast of Mississippi, but that the crews were saved. Both vessels were refloated, repaired, and returned to service. Brazen arrived at New Providence; Southampton arrived at Jamaica on 6 October. Although neither vessel was lost in the hurricane, Southampton was lost about a month later when she hit an uncharted rock.

Brazen sheltered in the lee of Grand Gosier Island, the southernmost of the Chandeleur Islands, and jettisoned her three masts and her quarterdeck and forecastle guns, but nevertheless dragged her three anchors to within a quarter of a mile from the beach. When the hurricane had passed, she salvaged the mainmast from the wreck of Warren and limped to the (then) Spanish port of Pensacola. The Spanish authorities allowed her to land some sailors to cut timber for the masts and throughout September the crew replaced the masts and carried out other repairs. On 29 September Brazen left Pensacola to resume her patrol off the mouth of the Mississippi. Stirling soon realised that the repairs had not made the ship completely seaworthy and decided to return her to Port Royal, where she arrived on 20 November. Further repairs were carried out in Jamaica, but the ship was recalled to England for a maintenance survey. She left on 19 December and arrived at Spithead on 9 February 1813, before sailing to Sheerness for the survey.

After the survey she sailed on 4 June 1813 as escort for a convoy carrying stores and settlers to Churchill in Hudson Bay. On 29 June Brazen recaptured Daphne. She anchored off Churchill on 19 August and left again on 20 September, escorting another convoy to England via the Orkney Islands and arriving at the Downs on 25 November.

On her return to England she received a commission in December to take the Duke of Brunswick to Holland. Then, between March and December 1814, she patrolled the Irish Sea and the Outer Hebrides in search of American vessels, leaving on 29 December to return to the West Indies.

Brazen arrived at Barbados early in February 1815 and received a commission to take the news of the Treaty of Ghent, which ended the War of 1812, to Fort Bowyer, which had been captured by British forces, and to carry the British troops to Havana and then back to England. Her arrival at Fort Bowyer forestalled a British attack on Mobile. Brazen left Mobile on 25 March 1815 and sailed from Havana on 4 April, returning home with General Sir John Lambert, Baynes, his Aide-de-camp, Lieutenant Harry Smith (later Lieutenant General Sir Harry Smith) and as many wounded as she could carry. Smith, in his autobiography, later wrote  They arrived at Portsmouth on 6 May.

Post-war
On 24 September 1816 she captured Hercules in Carlisle Bay, Barbados. Hercules was nicknamed "the Black Frigate" and was the flagship of the Argentinean Admiral William Brown. She was fighting on the side of the Venezuelan revolutionaries against the Spanish and had a valuable cargo of quicksilver, silks, steel, dry goods, and spice taken from Spanish towns and ships. The Governor of Barbados ordered her release, not wishing to prejudice British neutrality in that conflict. However Brazen seized her again after she left Barbados and took her to Antigua. Brown appealed and after long drawn out proceedings the High Court of Admiralty ruled in Brown's favour. Brazen received no prize money and Stirling continued to receive demands for damages for many years.

On 16 February 1817 Brazen captured Henry.

Between November 1816 and January 1818, Brazen took part in surveys of the Venezuelan coast and a trading arrangement with Simon Bolivar's insurgents may have been agreed on board. On 21 July 1818 she arrived in Portsmouth from Barbados, having made the voyage in 31 days.

Between December 1818 and January 1820 Brazen was at Portsmouth undergoing repairs and being fitted for sea. She was recommissioned in December 1819 under Captain William Shepheard. >

In 1820 and 1821 she served at St Helena and Ascension Island before returning to England. She arrived at Portsmouth on 31 October.

In January 1823 Captain George W. Willes took command.  On 2 December 1824 she captured Jane and her cargo. On 13 February 1825 she captured the sloop Elizabeth. On 18 March 1825 she was at Bognor, having chased on shore a tub boat and galley with cargoes of gin, tea, and tobacco. Anti-smuggling patrol might not be glamorous, but it could be lucrative.

On 21 May she captured the French lugger Courier. The revenue cutter Wellington and a boat from  assisted Brazen.  In November 1827 the Treasury gave a grant to the then crew of Brazen for smugglers captured in the year prior to 10 October 1825.

Suppressing the slave trade
By November 1825, while under the command of Willes, Brazen was serving with the West Africa Squadron. Although service with the squadron was highly dangerous because of the incidence of disease, it could be highly profitable for a successful captain such as Willes, who would in about a year make multiples of his salary in prize and head money for his capture of slavers. Although the crew received substantially less, they too roughly doubled their annual salary.

On her way out she had brought with her the British explorer Hugh Clapperton and his party. Also, on her way out, she had taken on 25 October the French schooner Éclair, out of Nantes and bound for Havana with 169 slaves aboard. Éclair had embarked the slaves at the River St Paul's near Cape Mount, but had lost a third of them in the surf during the process of embarkation.

Brazen captured the Spanish slave schooner Clara (or Clarita) on 4 November 1825, the brigantine Ninfa (or Ninfa Habanera), of 150 tons, with 231 slaves on board on 7 November 1825, and the Vogel on 22 January 1826.

On 22 January 1826 Brazen was in Sierra Leone, having sent in Malta, of Liverpool, which had dealt in slaves, and Iberia, of Havana, with 422 slaves on board. She had captured Iberia on 27 December 1825. On 15 May 1826, she seized the schooner Fortunée with 245 slaves.

On 11 June she seized San Benedicto but the British and Portuguese Mixed Commission Court at Sierra Leone ruled that the ship and her cargo were to be returned to her master. Then on 6 July she captured the Brazilian slave ship St. Benedict, fitted out for 690 slaves, but with only 25 on board. On 16 July she was at Cape Coast Castle, having recently captured the Portuguese slave schooner Fortuna, with 250 slaves on board, 45 of whom died en route for Sierra Leone. On 27 September she seized the brigantine Snelheid with 23 slaves.

On 28 November she was at Badagry, having arrived from Ouidah.

In addition Brazen boarded the following vessels:
 Modeste, 67 tons, of St Pierre, Martinique 269 slaves;
 Constance, 27 tons, of St Pierre, Martinique;
 Felix Africano, Brazilian, licensed to carry 567 slaves;
 Magico, 130 tons, of Havana;
 Eliza, Portuguese, 80 tons;
 Bienfaisant, of Rochelle, not fully fitted;
 Active, 149 tons, of Pernambuco; and
 Orestes, 102 tons, Spanish.

Fate

From May to September 1827 Brazen was fitted out at Chatham as an Anglican floating church destined for the Pool of London. On 10 February 1828 she was delivered to the Committee of the Floating Church at Deptford.The Committee returned her in 1846 and she was broken up at Deptford in July 1848.

Notes

Citations

References
Drew, Pamela Statham (2003) James Stirling, Admiral and Founding Governor of Western Australia. 
 
Moore Smith, G.C. (1902) The Autobiography of Lieutenant-General Sir Harry Smith, baronet of Aliwal on the Sutlej.
Murdoch, R.A. (1964) A British Report on West Florida and Louisiana, November 1812.
 

Ships built in Portsmouth
Sloops of the Royal Navy
1808 ships
Ships of the West Africa Squadron
Slavery in Africa
African slave trade
Maritime incidents in 1812